Boma Beatrice Obi is a Nigerian Professor of Library and Information Science. She is the 3rd University Librarian of Ignatius Ajuru University of Education.

Background 
Obi completed her primary education at Holy Child Convent Primary School in Abiakpo, in the region of Akwa Ibom. She then proceeded to Holy Rosary Secondary School in Port Harcourt, Rivers State where she obtained her West African School Certificate in 1971. In 1983, she obtained her bachelor's degree in English Literature from the University of Port Harcourt, Choba. In 1986 and 2005, she earned her Master's and Ph.D. degrees in Library and Information Science Education from University of Ibadan and University of Uyo.

Career
Obi began her career as a practicing Librarian and lecturer in 1987 at Rivers college of education [[Rumuolumeni, Port Harcourt]], Rivers state, Nigeria. She became a chartered Librarian in 2003 and was appointed as college librarian in 2006. She was a council member of Nigerian Library Association for two tenures and she was appointed third University Librarian of Ignatius Ajuru University of Education in 2017. She is currently the University Orator.

Fellowship
Obi is a Fellow of the International Federation of Library Association (IFLA). She is also a member of Association of University Librarians in Nigeria Universities (AULNU)  and a United Nations Peace Ambassador.

Article Publication 
Obi has published several articles and these include:

 Pricing Library and Information Services and Products

 Library Philosophy and Practice

 Academic Libraries for Empowerment of the Society and Citizens: Challenges for the 21st Century

References

Living people
1954 births
Academic staff of Ignatius Ajuru University of Education
University of Ibadan alumni
People from Rivers State
University of Port Harcourt alumni